JT is the eighth studio album by American singer-songwriter James Taylor. It was released on June 22, 1977, via Columbia Records, making it his first album released for the label. Recording session took place from March 15 to April 24, 1977, at The Sound Factory in Los Angeles with Val Garay. Production was handled by Peter Asher.

The album peaked at number 4 on the Billboard 200 albums chart in the United States and was Taylor's highest-charting album since Mud Slide Slim and the Blue Horizon. By January 31, 1997, it was certified 3 times Platinum by the Recording Industry Association of America. At the 20th Annual Grammy Awards, it was also nominated for Grammy Award for Album of the Year, but lost to Rumours by Fleetwood Mac.

The album spawned four singles: "Bartender's Blues", "Handy Man" (Taylor's final top 10 hit), "Your Smiling Face" and "Honey Don't Leave L.A.". "Handy Man", a Jimmy Jones cover, peaked at #4 on the Billboard Hot 100 and topped the Adult Contemporary and won the Grammy Award for Best Male Pop Vocal Performance. "Your Smiling Face", the other big hit, peaked at #20 on the Billboard Hot 100 and #6 on the Adult Contemporary chart. The record also contains other Taylor classics such as "Secret O' Life" and "Terra Nova", with the participation of Taylor's then-wife Carly Simon.

Track listing

Personnel 
 James Taylor – lead and backing vocals, acoustic guitar
 Danny Kortchmar – guitars
 Dan Dugmore – steel guitar (tracks: 2, 5)
 Dr. Clarence McDonald – keyboards
 Leland Sklar – bass guitar
 Russ Kunkel – drums, castanets (track 7), wood block (track 9), tambourine and handclaps (track 10)
 Peter Asher – cowbell (track 3), castanets (track 7), cabasa (tracks: 7, 9), wood block (track 9), tambourine and handclaps (track 10), producer
 David Sanborn – saxophone (track 3)
 Red Callender – tuba (track 10)
 David Campbell – string arrangements and conductor (tracks: 1, 5), viola (track 2)
 Linda Ronstadt – harmony vocals (track 5)
 Leah Kunkel – backing vocals (track 7)
 Carly Simon – harmony vocals (track 10)
Technical
 Val Garay – recording, mixing
 Doug Sax – mastering
 John Kosh – art direction, design
 David Alexander – front cover, sleeve photos
 Jim Shea – back cover, inside photos

Charts

Certifications

References

External links

1977 albums
James Taylor albums
Columbia Records albums
Albums produced by Peter Asher
Albums arranged by David Campbell (composer)